Garnett Sue Stokes (born December 20, 1955) is an American academic administrator serving as the 23rd president of the University of New Mexico. She assumed office on March 1, 2018.

Early life and education 
Stokes was born in Washington, D.C. She earned a Bachelor of Arts degree in psychology from Carson–Newman University, followed by a Master of Science and PhD in industrial and organizational psychology from the University of Georgia.

Career 
Stokes served as a professor in the psychology department at the University of Georgia from 1985 until 2011, rising from assistant professor to professor. She chaired the department of psychology from 1999 to 2004. She served as dean of Franklin College of Arts and Sciences from 2004 until 2011.

Stokes served as the provost for Florida State University from August 2011 to January 2015. From February to November 2014, she served as the university's interim president.

Stokes served as the provost and executive vice chancellor for academic affairs at the University of Missouri from February 2015 to January 2018. She briefly served as interim chancellor in 2015.

Stokes was named the 23rd president of University of New Mexico on November 2, 2017, making her the first female president of the university.

References

1955 births
Living people
Florida State University faculty
University of Georgia faculty
University of Missouri faculty
University of New Mexico presidents